Mirsad Hadžikadić (born 21 January 1955) is a Bosnian professor and politician. He is the current president of the Platform for Progress party.

Hadžikadić is also the director of the Institute of Complex Systems at the University of North Carolina at Charlotte. At the 2018 general election, he ran for a seat in the Presidency of Bosnia and Herzegovina as a Bosniak member, but was not elected.

Biography
Hadžikadić was born in Banja Luka in a Bosniak household. In 1984, he moved to the United States, receiving a PhD in Computer Science at Southern Methodist University in 1987.

In April 2018, Hadžikadić announced he would run at the 2018 Bosnian general election for the seat of Bosniak member of the Presidency of Bosnia and Herzegovina. He gathered 58,555 preferential votes, obtaining 10.09% of the total vote for the Bosniak seat. He leads the Platform for Progress party.

On 9 December 2021, Hadžikadić once again announced he would run at the 2022 general election for the Bosniak seat in the Presidency.

References

External links

1955 births
Living people
People from Banja Luka
University of Banja Luka alumni
Southern Methodist University alumni
Harvard Kennedy School alumni
University of North Carolina at Charlotte faculty
Bosnia and Herzegovina politicians